is a former Japanese football player.

Playing career
Ono was born in Tokyo on April 9, 1974. He joined Verdy Kawasaki from youth team in 1993. However he could not play at all in the match. In July 1996, he moved to Japan Football League club Denso on loan and he played many matches. After he returned to Verdy in 1997, he moved to Gamba Osaka in 1998. Although he debuted in J1 League, he could hardly play in the match. In 1999, he moved to new club Yokohama FC in Japan Football League (JFL). He played many matches and the club won the champions for 2 years in a row (1999-2000). The club was also promoted to J2 League from 2001 and he became a regular player. He played until 2005 season. In 2006, he moved to Regional Leagues club New Wave Kitakyushu. He played as regular player and the club was promoted to JFL from 2008. However his opportunity to play decreased and he retired end of 2009 season.

Club statistics

References

External links

1974 births
Living people
Association football people from Tokyo
Japanese footballers
J1 League players
J2 League players
Japan Football League (1992–1998) players
Japan Football League players
Tokyo Verdy players
FC Kariya players
Gamba Osaka players
Yokohama FC players
Giravanz Kitakyushu players
Association football midfielders